Joseph Bascourt (15 September 1863 in Brussels – 6 March 1927 Antwerp) was a Belgian architect who designed numerous Art Nouveau buildings in and around Antwerp. Among his contributions to the landscape of the city are 25 houses in the Zurenborg neighbourhood, and the community centre in Wilrijk (1914–20).

He also designed the Nottebohm Clinic (Biartstraat 2, 2018 Antwerp), founded as a skin clinic, still in use as a home for the elderly.

References

1863 births
1927 deaths
Art Nouveau architects
Architects from Brussels